Rakovci may refer to:

 Rakovci, Slovenia, a village near Sveti Tomaž
 Rakovci, Croatia, a village near Poreč